Vanessa Alessandra Teixeira Porto (born March 16, 1984) is a Brazilian mixed martial artist and amateur boxer who competes in the Bellator MMA flyweight division.

Background
Porto grew up in Jaú, São Paulo in a family of soccer players. She had an appreciation for martial arts from a young age and started to practice Brazilian jiu-jitsu in 2004. She is currently married to her trainer Pedro Iglesias.

Mixed martial arts career

Early career
Porto began her professional MMA career in 2005. She initially fought only for Brazilian promotions such as Storm Samurai and Champions Night and faced opponents including Carina Damm, Cris Cyborg and Brazilian kickboxing champion Juliana Werner Aguiar. She defeated Aguiar on three occasions.

With a record of five wins and two losses, Porto signed with the U.S.-based Fatal Femmes Fighting promotion.

Fatal Femmes Fighting and Revolution Fight Club
Porto made her FFF debut against Tonya Evinger on July 14, 2007, at Fatal Femmes Fighting 2. She defeated Evinger via submission due to an armbar in the first round.

Porto was expected to face FFF bantamweight champion Roxanne Modafferi on November 3, 2007, at Fatal Femmes Fighting 3. However, Modafferi was removed from the event due to a shoulder injury and was replaced by Hitomi Akano. Porto defeated Akano via split decision after five rounds. Her match for the FFF bantamweight title against Modafferi happened on April 3, 2008, at Fatal Femmes Fighting 4. Porto lost via TKO for the first time in her MMA career.

Porto faced Germaine de Randamie on December 19, 2008, at Revolution Fight Club 2. She won via submission due to an armbar in the first round.

Return to Brazilian promotions
Between December 2008 and March 2011, Porto amassed five victories and suffered a single loss against Amanda Nunes. On October 28, 2011, Porto defeated Jennifer Maia via technical submission due to an armbar at Kumite MMA Combate.

Porto became the first Pink Fight champion at 132 pounds on March 10, 2012, when she knocked out Luana Teixeira at Pink Fight 2.

In mid-2012, after a long time away from American promotions, Porto signed with Invicta Fighting Championships.

Invicta Fighting Championships
Porto was expected to make her Invicta FC debut against Kelly Kobold on July 28, 2012, at Invicta FC 2: Baszler vs. McMann. However, Kobold suffered a shoulder injury and Porto instead faced Sarah D'Alelio. Porto lost the fight via submission due to a reverse triangle armbar in the first round.

Porto dropped down to 125 pounds and faced Tara LaRosa on October 6, 2012, at Invicta FC 3: Penne vs. Sugiyama. She won the fight via unanimous decision.

Porto then fought against Barb Honchak on April 5, 2013, at Invicta FC 5: Penne vs. Waterson in a five-round match to determine the first-ever Invicta FC flyweight champion. She lost the fight via unanimous decision.

Porto faced Zoila Frausto Gurgel on December 7, 2013, at Invicta FC 7. She won the fight via unanimous decision.

Porto was expected to face Roxanne Modafferi at Invicta FC 10: Waterson vs. Tiburcioon December 5, 2014. However she was replaced by Andrea Lee  due to visa issue.

Porto the fought Roxanne Modafferi at Invicta FC 12: Kankaanpää vs. Souza on Friday, April 24, 2015. She won the fight via unanimous decision.

On March 11, 2016, Porto face Jennifer Maia second time at Invicta FC 16: Hamasaki vs. Brown. She lost the fight via unanimous decision.

At her next fight, she faced Agnieszka Niedźwiedź at Invicta FC 23: Porto vs. Niedźwiedź.  She lost the fight after three round with the judges handed down a win to Niedzwiedz via a unanimous decision.

Porta was expected to face Jessica-Rose Clark on December 8, 2018, at Invicta FC 26: Maia vs. Niedwiedz; however, Clark was replaced byd Milana Dudieva.

At the weight-ins, Porta weight 127.6 Ibs, misse weight by 2.6 Ibs of the upper flyweight limit of 125 Ibs, and was fined twenty five percent of her purse. The bout proceeded at catchweight. Porta won the fight via technical knocked out on round three.

One month later, she fought against Mariana Morais on January 13, 2018, at Invicta FC 27: Kaufman vs. Kianzad.  She won the fight via a rear-naked choke on round one.

Porto faced Pearl Gonzalez for the vacant Invicta FC Flyweight World Championship at Invicta FC 34 on February 15, 2019. She won the fight via technical decision after an eye poke rendered Porto unable to continue.

Porto was supposed to make her first title defense against Karina Rodríguez at Invicta FC 38: Murato vs. Ducote on November 1, 2019. However, Rodríguez missed weight by a pound and she was unable to compete for the title. She won the bout via unanimous decision.

Bellator MMA

On September 2, 2020, it was announced that Vanessa was vacating her Invicta title and signing with Bellator MMA.

As the first bout of her four-fight contract, Porto made her promotional debut against Liz Carmouche on April 9, 2021, at Bellator 256. She lost the bout via unanimous decision.

Porto was scheduled to face Ilara Joanne on June 11, 2021, at Bellator 260. However, after weigh-ins, she was deemed unfit to compete by the commission and the bout was scrapped. The bout was rescheduled for July 31, 2021, at Bellator 263. Porto won the close bout via split decision.

Porto faced Veta Arteaga on July 22, 2022, at Bellator 283. She lost the bout via guillotine choke in the second round.

Championships and accomplishments

Mixed martial arts
Invicta Fighting Championships
Invicta FC Flyweight World Championship (one time)
Fight of the Night (One time) vs. Jennifer Maia
Pink Fight
Pink Fight 132-pound champion (one time; only)

Amateur boxing
Federação Paulista de Boxe
São Paulo State Champion
Jogos Abertos do Interior
2nd Women's Division: Silver Medal (2011, 64 kg)

Mixed martial arts record

|-
|Loss
|align=center|23–10
|Veta Arteaga
|Submission (guillotine choke)
|Bellator 283
|
|align=center|2
|align=center|3:47
|Tacoma, Washington, United States
|
|-
| Win
| align=center| 23–9
|Ilara Joanne
|Decision (split)
|Bellator 263
|
|align=center|3
|align=center|5:00
|Los Angeles, California, United States
|
|-
|Loss
|align=center|22–9
|Liz Carmouche
|Decision (unanimous)
|Bellator 256 
|
|align=center|3
|align=center|5:00
|Uncasville, Connecticut, United States 
|
|-
| Win
| align=center| 22–8
| Karina Rodríguez
| Decision (unanimous)
| Invicta FC 38: Murato vs. Ducote
| 
| align=center| 3
| align=center| 5:00
| Kansas City, Kansas, United States
|
|-
| Win
| align=center| 21–8
| Pearl Gonzalez
| Technical Decision (unanimous)
| Invicta FC 34: Porto vs. Gonzalez
| 
| align=center| 4
| align=center| 2:34
| Kansas City, Missouri, United States
|
|-
| Win
| align=center| 20–8
| Mariana Morais
| Submission (rear-naked choke)
| Invicta FC 27: Kaufman vs. Kianzad
| 
| align=center| 1
| align=center| 4:19
| Kansas City, Missouri, United States
| 
|-
| Win
| align=center| 19–8
| Milana Dudieva
| TKO (punch to the body)
| Invicta FC 26: Maia vs. Niedźwiedź
| 
| align=center| 3
| align=center| 3:02
| Kansas City, Missouri, United States
| 
|-
| Loss
| align=center| 18–8
| Agnieszka Niedźwiedź
| Decision (unanimous)
| Invicta FC 23: Porto vs. Niedźwiedź
| 
| align=center| 3
| align=center| 5:00
| Kansas City, Missouri, United States
| 
|-
| Loss
| align=center| 18–7
| Jennifer Maia
| Decision (unanimous)
| Invicta FC 16: Hamasaki vs. Brown
| 
| align=center| 5
| align=center| 5:00
| Las Vegas, Nevada, United States
| 
|-
| Win
| align=center| 18–6
| Roxanne Modafferi
| Decision (unanimous)
| Invicta FC 12: Kankaanpää vs. Souza
| 
| align=center| 3
| align=center| 5:00
| Kansas City, Missouri, United States
| 
|-
| Win
| align=center| 17–6
| Ana Maria
| Decision (unanimous)
| Fatality Arena 6
| 
| align=center| 3
| align=center| 5:00
| Rio de Janeiro, Brazil
| 
|-
| Win
| align=center| 16–6
| Zoila Frausto
| Decision (unanimous)
| Invicta FC 7: Honchak vs. Smith
| 
| align=center| 3
| align=center| 5:00
| Kansas City, Missouri, United States
| 
|-
| Loss
| align=center| 15–6
| Barb Honchak
| Decision (unanimous)
| Invicta FC 5: Penne vs. Waterson
| 
| align=center| 5
| align=center| 5:00
| Kansas City, Missouri, United States
| 
|-
| Win
| align=center| 15–5
| Tara LaRosa
| Decision (unanimous)
| Invicta FC 3: Penne vs. Sugiyama
| 
| align=center| 3
| align=center| 5:00
| Kansas City, Kansas, United States
| 
|-
| Loss
| align=center| 14–5
| Sarah D'Alelio
| Submission (reverse triangle armbar)
| Invicta FC 2: Baszler vs. McMann
| 
| align=center| 1
| align=center| 3:16
| Kansas City, Kansas, United States
| 
|-
| Win
| align=center| 14–4
| Luana Teixeira
| KO (punch)
| Pink Fight 2
| 
| align=center| 1
| align=center| 0:41
| Campos dos Goytacazes, Rio de Janeiro, Brazil
| 
|-
| Win
| align=center| 13–4
| Jennifer Maia
| Technical submission (armbar)
| Kumite MMA Combate
| 
| align=center| 2
| align=center| 3:55
| Porto Alegre, Rio Grande do Sul, Brazil
| 
|-
| Win
| align=center| 12–4
| Kalindra Faria
| Submission (armbar)
| Recife Fighting Championship 4
| 
| align=center| 1
| align=center| 3:37
| Recife, Pernambuco, Brazil
| 
|-
| Win
| align=center| 11–4
| Valdinéia Santos
| TKO (punches)
| Predador FC 17
| 
| align=center| 1
| align=center| N/A
| Jaú, São Paulo, Brazil
| 
|-
| Loss
| align=center| 10–4
| Amanda Nunes
| TKO (corner stoppage)
| Samurai FC 2: Warrior's Return
| 
| align=center| 2
| align=center| 5:00
| Curitiba, Paraná, Brazil
| 
|-
| Win
| align=center| 10–3
| Roberta Torno
| Submission (armbar)
| Jungle Fight 16
| 
| align=center| 1
| align=center| 1:47
| Rio de Janeiro, Brazil
| 
|-
| Win
| align=center| 9–3
| Mahalia Rocha de Morais
| Submission (armbar)
| Jungle Fight 15
| 
| align=center| 1
| align=center| 4:28
| São Paulo, Brazil
| 
|-
| Win
| align=center| 8–3
| Germaine de Randamie
| Submission (armbar)
| Revolution Fight Club 2
| 
| align=center| 1
| align=center| 3:36
| Miami, Florida, United States
| 
|-
| Loss
| align=center| 7–3
| Roxanne Modafferi
| TKO (knees)
| Fatal Femmes Fighting 4: Call of the Wild
| 
| align=center| 3
| align=center| 0:53
| Los Angeles, California, United States
| 
|-
| Win
| align=center| 7–2
| Hitomi Akano
| Decision (split)
| Fatal Femmes Fighting 3: War of the Roses
| 
| align=center| 5
| align=center| 3:00
| Ontario, California, United States
| 
|-
| Win
| align=center| 6–2
| Tonya Evinger
| Submission (armbar)
| Fatal Femmes Fighting 2: Girls Night Out
| 
| align=center| 1
| align=center| 2:14
| Compton, California, United States
| 
|-
| Win
| align=center| 5–2
| Juliana Werner Aguiar
| Submission (arm-triangle choke)
| Super Challenge 1
| 
| align=center| 1
| align=center| 1:20
| Barueri, São Paulo, Brazil
| 
|-
| Win
| align=center| 4–2
| Ana Maria Índia
| Submission (rear-naked choke)
| Gold Fighters Championship 1
| 
| align=center| 2
| align=center| 4:45
| Rio de Janeiro, Brazil
| 
|-
| Loss
| align=center| 3–2
| Cris Cyborg
| Decision (unanimous)
| Storm Samurai 9
| 
| align=center| 3
| align=center| 5:00
| Curitiba, Paraná, Brazil
| 
|-
| Win
| align=center| 3–1
| Juliana Werner Aguiar
| Technical submission (arm-triangle choke)
| Storm Samurai 8
| 
| align=center| 1
| align=center| 0:33
| Brasília, Brazil
| 
|-
| Win
| align=center| 2–1
| Juliana Werner Aguiar
| TKO (punches)
| Champions Night 12
| 
| align=center| 1
| align=center| 4:08
| Marília, São Paulo, Brazil
| 
|-
| Win
| align=center| 1–1
| Elaine de Lima
| Submission (armbar)
| Body Fight 2
| 
| align=center| 1
| align=center| 1:01
| Maringá, Paraná, Brazil
| 
|-
| Loss
| align=center| 0–1
| Carina Damm
| Decision (unanimous)
| Barra Submission Wrestling
| 
| align=center| 2
| align=center| 5:00
| São João da Barra, Rio de Janeiro, Brazil
|

See also
 List of current Bellator fighters
 List of female mixed martial artists

References

External links 
 
 Vanessa Porto at Invicta FC

1984 births
Living people
Brazilian female mixed martial artists
Brazilian women boxers
Brazilian practitioners of Brazilian jiu-jitsu
Female Brazilian jiu-jitsu practitioners
Flyweight mixed martial artists
Mixed martial artists utilizing boxing
Mixed martial artists utilizing Brazilian jiu-jitsu
People from Americana, São Paulo
Sportspeople from São Paulo (state)
People from Jaú